is an Ōbaku Zen temple in Nagasaki, Nagasaki, Japan.

Shōfuku-ji was the fourth of a series of temples built in the 17th century by the Chinese community of Nagasaki. Its construction was completed in 1677 by Chinese merchants from the Canton region. However Shōfuku-ji is not always included with the other Chinese temples (Fukusai-ji, Sōfuku-ji, and Kofukuji) as the earlier temples did not initially belong to the Ōbaku sect, whereas Shōfuku-ji was founded by a disciple of Ingen, his grandson Tetsushin Douhan.

References 

Buddhist temples in Nagasaki Prefecture
Obaku temples
Buildings and structures in Nagasaki
1677 establishments in Japan